Tvoje lice zvuči poznato 1 (Cyrillic: Твоје лице звучи познато) was the first season of the Serbian reality contest based on the international franchise Your Face Sounds Familiar. It broadcast between October 12 and December 28, 2013.  The judging panel consisted of late night talk show host Ivan Ivanović, singer and vocal coach Marija Mihajlović, actress Katarina Radivojević and a different guest judge each week. The series was hosted by Marija Kilibarda and actor Petar Strugar. The show's winner was singer Ana Kokić.

Format
The show challenges celebrities (singers and actors) to perform as different iconic music artists every week, which are chosen by the show's "Randomiser". They are then judged by the panel of celebrity judges including Ivan Ivanović, Katarina Radivojević and Marija Mihajlović. Each week, one celebrity guest judge joins Ivan, Katarina and Marija to make up the complete judging panel. Marija Mihajlović is also a voice coach. Each celebrity gets transformed into a different singer each week and performs an iconic song and dance routine well known by that particular singer. The 'randomiser' can choose any older or younger artist available in the machine, or even a singer of the opposite sex, or a deceased singer. Winner of each episode wins €1000, and winner of whole show wins €25000. All money goes to charity of winner's own choice. The show lasts 12 weeks.

Voting
The contestants are awarded points from the judges (and each other) based on their singing and dance routines. Judges give points from 2 to 12, with the exception of 11. After that, each contestant gives 5 points to a fellow contestant of their choice (known as "Bonus" points). In week 11 (semi-final week) and in week 12 (final week), viewers also vote via text messages. In week 11 (semi-final), all judges points from past weeks and from semi-final are made into points from 2 to 12 (without 11). Contestants with most judges points will get 12 points, second placed will get 10, third placed 9 and 10th placed will get only 2 points. After that, public votes will also be made into points from 2 to 12, again with the exception of 11. Contestant with most public votes will get 12 points, second placed 10 and 10th placed will get only 2. All those points will be summed up and five contestants with most points will go to final week. In final week, judges will not vote - contestant with most public vote will win the show.

Contestants

Series overview

Week 1 (October 12)
Guest Judge: Dragana Mirković 
Winner: Tamara Dragičević

Bonus points
Željko Šašić gave five points to Knez
Sara Jovanović gave five points to Tamara Dragičević
Goca Tržan gave five points to Sneki
Tamara Dragičević gave five points to Boris Milivojević
Knez gave five points to Wikluh Sky
Aleksa Jelić gave five points to Tamara Dragičević
Sneki gave five points to Goca Tržan
Boris Milivojević gave five points to Ana Kokić
Ana Kokić gave five points to Wikluh Sky
Wikluh Sky gave five points to Knez

Week 2 (October 19)
Guest Judge: Severina 
Winner: Ana Kokić

Bonus points
Ana gave five points to Sara
Wikluh Sky gave five points to Ana
Knez gave five points to Goca
Tamara gave five points to Aleksa
Željko gave five points to Ana
Aleksa gave five points to Ana
Goca gave five points to Knez
Boris gave five points to Sneki
Sara gave five points to Ana
Sneki gave five points to Boris

Week 3 (October 26)
Guest Judge: Miroslav Ilić
Winner: Boris Milivojević 

Bonus points
Knez gave five points to Željko
Wikluh Sky gave five points to Sneki
Sneki gave five points to Aleksa
Aleksa gave five points to Sneki
Goca gave five points to Željko
Tamara gave five points to Ana
Ana gave five points to Boris
Sara gave five points to Željko
Željko gave five points to Boris
Boris gave five points to Aleksa

Week 4 (November 2)
Guest Judge: Savo Milošević 
Winner: Željko Šašić

Bonus points
Sara gave five points to Goca
Boris gave five points to Knez
Sneki gave five points to Wikluh Sky
Željko gave five points to Sneki
Aleksa gave five points to Sara
Ana gave five points to Željko
Tamara gave five points to Sara
Goca gave five points to Ana
Wikluh Sky gave five points to Knez
Knez gave five points to Wikluh Sky

Week 5 (November 9)
Guest Judge: Marija Šerifović
Winner: Sneki

Bonus points
Sneki gave five points to Ana
Tamara gave five points to Sneki
Wikluh Sky gave five points to Željko
Goca gave five points to Aleksa
Aleksa gave five points to Wikluh Sky
Boris gave five points to Sneki
Sara gave five points to Sneki
Željko gave five points to Sara
Ana gave five points to Sneki
Knez gave five points to Boris

Week 6 (November 16)
Guest Judge: Bora Đorđević  
Winner: Aleksa Jelić

Bonus points
Tamara gave five points to Aleksa
Boris gave five points to Goca
Aleksa gave five points to Goca
Ana gave five points to Aleksa
Sneki gave five points to Željko
Knez gave five points to Željko
Željko gave five points to Goca
Wikluh Sky gave five points to Boris
Sara gave five points to Aleksa
Goca gave five points to Sara

Week 7 (November 23)
Guest Judge: Tony Cetinski
Winner: Wikluh Sky

Bonus points
Tamara gave five points to Wikluh Sky
Sneki gave five points to Tamara
Boris gave five points to Željko
Knez gave five points to Wikluh Sky
Sara gave five points to Wikluh Sky
Aleksa gave five points to Knez
Wikluh Sky gave five points to Aleksa
Željko gave five points to Sneki
Ana gave five points to Goca
Goca gave five points to Wikluh Sky

Week 8 (November 30)
Guest Judge: Sergej Trifunović
Winner: Goca Tržan

Bonus points
Goca gave five points to Boris
Wikluh Sky gave five points to Goca
Sara gave five points to  Boris
Ana gave five points to Boris
Sneki gave five points to Sara
Željko gave five points to Tamara
Boris gave five points to Sara
Knez gave five points to Goca
Aleksa gave five points to Goca
Tamara gave five points to Goca

Week 9 (December 7)
Guest Judge: Nataša Bekvalac
Winner: Knez

Bonus points
Boris gave five point to Tamara
Sneki gave five point to Željko
Ana gave five point to Knez
Tamara gave five point to Željko
Sara gave five point to Knez
Aleksa gave five point to Boris
Goca gave five point to Knez
Knez gave five point to Aleksa
Željko gave five point to Knez
Wikluh Sky gave five point to Knez

Week 10 (December 14)
Guest Judge: Haris Džinović
Winner: Sara Jovanović

Bonus points
Tamara gave five points to Sara
Željko gave five points to Sara
Wikluh Sky gave five points to Boris
Sneki gave five points to Sara
Knez gave five points to Sara
Sara gave five points to Goca
Aleksa gave five points to Željko
Goca gave five points to Tamara
Ana gave five points to Sara
Boris gave five points to Wikluh Sky

Semi-final (December 21)
Guest Judge: Dragoljub Mićko Ljubičić
Winner: Aleksa Jelić

Bonus points
Ana gave five points to Tamara
Sneki gave five points to Boris
Aleksa gave five points to Sara
Željko gave five points to Wikluh Sky
Goca gave five points to Knez
Knez gave five points to Goca
Wikluh Sky gave five points to Boris
Sara gave five points to Aleksa
Tamara gave five points to Knez
Boris gave five points to Sneki

Final (December 28)
Series winner: Ana Kokić

Notes
1.Wikluh Sky and Sneki performed together.
2.Ana Kokić and Aleksa Jelić performed together.
3.Boris is singing Halid's song, but will perform as Ivica Dačić, Serbian prime minister, because Dačić sang that song in public once and it became a huge internet hit in Serbia. Halid was a special guest on the show.
4.Ana and Željko performed together.
5.Željko and Knez performed together.
6.Wikluh Sky and Sara performed together, featuring a guest appearance by Wikluh's colleague and famous rapper Ajs Nigrutin as American rapper 2 Chainz.
7.Tamara imitated Azra from cult Serbian movie "Dom za vešanje".
8.Wikluh Sky and Aleksa performed together.
9.Tamara and Aleksa have both imitated the same singer Michael Jackson together and they made tribute performance singing five songs.
10.Sara and Tamara performed together.
11.Goca and Knez performed together.
12.Željko and Wikluh Sky performed together.
13.Aleksa and Ana performed together.
14.Goca and Knez performed together.
15.Special episode included best performances from season one.
16.Goca and Katarina Radivojević (jury member) performed together in the final part of review program.
17.Wikluh Sky and Ivan Ivanović (jury member) performed together in the final part of review program.
18.Željko and Marija Mihajlović (jury member) performed together in the final part of review program
19.Sneki and Zile (choreographer) performed together in the final part of review program.

References

Serbia
2013 Serbian television seasons